Józef Kempa (14 March 1905 – 13 August 1944) was a Polish actor. He was active in theatre and film between 1918 and 1944. He was a civilian fatality of the Warsaw Uprising, dying in the explosion of a German Borgward IV demolition vehicle on 13 August 1944.

Select filmography
Róża (1936)
Plomienne serca (1937)
Sygnały (1938)

References

External links

1905 births
1944 deaths
Male actors from Warsaw
Polish male stage actors
Polish male film actors
20th-century Polish male actors
Polish civilians killed in World War II